Turris intricata is a species of sea snail, a marine gastropod mollusk in the family Turridae, the turrids.

Description
The length of the shell attains 34 mm.

Distribution
This marine species occurs off the Hawaii.

References

 Kilburn R.N., Fedosov A.E. & Olivera B.M. (2012) Revision of the genus Turris Batsch, 1789 (Gastropoda: Conoidea: Turridae) with the description of six new species. Zootaxa 3244: 1-58.

External links
 Powell, A.W.B. (1964). The family Turridae in the Indo-Pacific. Part 1. The subfamily Turrinae. Indo-Pacific Mollusca. 1 (5): 227-346; 1 (7): 409-454.

intricata
Gastropods described in 1964